Lewis Jamieson (born 17 April 2002) is a Scottish professional footballer who plays as a forward for St Mirren. He has previously played for Clyde (twice), Inverness Caledonian Thistle and Airdrieonians.

Youth career 
Born in Scotland, Jamieson spent his youth career with St Mirren U20 from the age of 17.

Career

St Mirren: 2019-present 
Jamieson signed his first senior contract with St Mirren F.C. in 2019. He was included in squad of St Mirren to take part in the 2019-20 Scottish Premiership season. Despite making it to the squad, Jamieson missed out to make any league appearance of the club in the season. Jamieson made four appearances for the club in the Scottish League Challenge Cup that season. Jamieson stayed at St Mirren for the 2020-21 Scottish Premiership season. 

Jamieson made his league debut against Rangers FC on 9 August 2020 as a substitute for Cameron MacPherson in the 85th minute of the match. The match ended 3–0 to Rangers. Jamieson made his Scottish League Cup debut against Partick Thistle F.C. on 7 October 2020 as a substitute for Jonathan Obika in the 84th minute of the game. The match ended 4–1 to St Mirren.

Clyde (loan) 
Jamieson was loaned to Scottish third tier club Clyde FC in March 2021. He played his debut match for the club on 20 March against East Fife, which they lost 1–3.

Inverness Caledonian Thistle (loan) 
In July 2021 Jamieson was loaned for the 2021–22 season to Scottish Championship (second tier) club Inverness Caledonian Thistle. He made twelve appearances and scored three goals in all competitions for the club before being recalled by St Mirren on 25 January 2022.

Clyde (2nd loan) 
On 25 January 2022, Jamieson returned to Clyde on loan until the end of the season, and would make his 2nd debut on the same day.

Airdrieonians (loan) 
On 27 July 2022, Jamieson joined Airdrieonians on loan. 

After a successful loan stint in which he scored 8 goals in 20 appearances, Jamieson was recalled on 25 January 2023 by St Mirren.

Career statistics

References

External links 
 
 
 
 Lewis Jamieson at Sky Sports
 
 Lewis Jamieson at Fox Sports
 Lewis Jamieson at Football Critic

2002 births
Living people
Scottish footballers
St Mirren F.C. players
Scottish Professional Football League players
Association football forwards
Clyde F.C. players
Inverness Caledonian Thistle F.C. players
Airdrieonians F.C. players